Christine Linda Bridge (born 31 October 1961) is an Australian sailor who represented Australia at the 1992 Barcelona Olympics and the 1996 Atlanta Olympics.

Bridge competed in the 1992 Europe dinghy event and finished in 20th place. Four years later in Atlanta she finished eleventh in the 1996 Europe dinghy event. Her best performances in the heats were a fourth, fifth and sixth place.

References

External links
 
 
 
 

1961 births
Living people
Australian female sailors (sport)
Olympic sailors of Australia
Sailors at the 1992 Summer Olympics – Europe
Sailors at the 1996 Summer Olympics – Europe
20th-century Australian women